Tanggula South railway station  is a station on the Chinese Qinghai–Tibet Railway.

See also
 List of highest railway stations in the world
 Qinghai–Tibet Railway
 List of stations on Qinghai–Tibet railway

Railway stations in Tibet
Stations on the Qinghai–Tibet Railway